Encephalartos macrostrobilus is a species of cycad in Africa. It is found only in Moyo District, northwestern Uganda, which is populated predominantly by the ethnic Madi.

Description
It is a cycad with an arborescent habit, with an erect or decombent stem, up to 2.5 m tall and 30-45 cm in diameter. 
The pinnate leaves, arranged like a crown at the apex of the stem, are 1.4-2.2 m long, supported by a 12-15 cm long petiole, and composed of numerous pairs of lanceolate, leathery leaflets, up to 25 long cm, insert on the rachis at right angles
It is a dioecious species, with male specimens presenting from 6 to 14 closely ovoid cones, erect, 18–20 cm long and 5 cm broad, olive green in color, and female specimens with 1-3 large cylindrical-ovoid cones, long to at 80 cm and 30 cm wide, initially dark green, olive green when ripe.
The seeds are coarsely ovoid, 3.2-3.6 cm long, covered by a yellow to red seed coat.

References

External links

macrostrobilus
Endemic flora of Uganda